T.B. Townsend (born 1837) was a farmer and building company owner. He had one of "the most extensive and well-improved farms in" Marion County, Ohio, at the start of the 20th century, the  Rockland Farm. He was also president of T. B. Townsend Brick and Contracting Co. in Zanesville, Ohio, claimed to be the largest brick factory in Ohio at the time.

Background
Townsend was born in Pittsburgh, Pennsylvania in 1837 and moved to Beverly, Ohio in 1846. He moved to Zanesville in 1867. his properties included a carriage house, horse barn, granary, an "immense" cattle barn, a store, dwelling house for operator, and four houses "for the men that work on the ranch". The property was overseen by Hans Johnson, a Dane. Townsend also owned stockyards and the office of the Townsend Cattle Co. Townsend raised cattle including stockers and feeders, as well as hogs.

Building career
Townsend became a mason and then a contractor and builder at the age of 21. He built several stores, dwellings, court houses, railroads, sewers, and bridges. His works include the Muskingum County Courthouse, Wood County Courthouse, Guernsey County Courthouse, Tuscarawas County Courthouse, Miami County Courthouse,  and the Arlington Hotel (since demolished).

Brick was in high demand for use as pavers (including at the "Brickyard" racetrack Indianapolis Motor Speedway) in the early 20th century, and Townsend's bricks are collected along with other historic examples at "Redbud Alley" in Columbus, Ohio.

References

1837 births
Businesspeople from Ohio
Year of death missing
Businesspeople from Pittsburgh
People from Zanesville, Ohio